Eric Gaffney (born December 25, 1967, in Cambridge, Massachusetts) is an American songwriter and recording artist, and has been home recording on cassette since 1981. An active participant in the Western Mass hardcore scene, in 1983 he founded, wrote songs for, and drummed with Grey Matter, opening hall shows with Jerry's Kids, F.U.s, The Freeze, Big Boys, Raw Power, Adrenalin O.D., Siege, 7 Seconds, Outpatients, Pajama Slave Dancers, Da Stupids, and others.

Career

In 1984, he joined No Preservatives as lead singer. He was also editor of 'Withdrawal Fanzine,’ and contributed scene reports for Maximum Rock 'N' Roll. In 1986, he co-founded 'Gracefully Aging Hippy Soloists' with Charlie Ondras.

In 1988, he did the artwork, tape duplication, and local distribution for the first Sebadoh release: 'The Freed Man' cassette. The tape was favorably reviewed by Gerard Cosloy and resulted in a 3-record deal with Homestead Records.
 
In 1989, a split-single with Big Stick, was released in the UK, followed by 'Magic Ribbons Box Set', a split with King Missile. Gaffney co-founded and arranged for the first practice of Sebadoh, and booked the first few shows for Sebadoh. Sheehan's, WMHC Hall Show in Chicopee, Katina's, Hampshire College, Middle East Cafe. ‘The Freed Weed’ was issued on CD, followed by a 7” on Vertical Records. Gaffney created the cover art for 'Sebadoh III,' and the album collage art. The III U.S. tour followed Firehose from Ames, Iowa to Durango, Colorado. The band signed to both Sub Pop, 20/20 (Domino) and City Slang in 1992, followed by tours of the UK wtih The Wedding Present, BBC Session, plus dates in Europe with Pavement and Sonic Youth. Gaffney contributed the title and collage art, and CD layout for 'Smash Your Head on the Punk Rock, The front cover photograph for 'Rockin' The Forest,' and titled 'Sebadoh Vs. Helmet.’ In 1993 'Bubble & Scrape.’ sold 10,000 copies in the first week, followed by two U.S. tours, and a tour of UK/Europe, including Glastonbury, Lollapalooza. Gaffney left the band in late 1993.

After leaving Sebadoh, Gaffney booked solo shows in New York (Space at Chase, Bard College, Brownies, Maxwells) and released 'It Lights Up & Spins Around' on cassette in 1998, performing and recording with his own project Fields of Gaffney, opening shows with Royal Trux, Danielson Family, Buffalo Tom. Old Gold (Atlanta) released ‘Brilliant Concert Numbers’ on CD in 1999, and Sub Pop released a single-club 7” on blue vinyl. Gaffney relocated to San Francisco, re-formed the band with new members, and booked mini-tours for New York/Brooklyn, 2002, SXSW plus Southwest U.S., and Northwest U.S., 2003–2004.

In 2006, 'Uncharted Waters' was released on Old Gold (Atlanta) and Handmade Records (Oslo)  Gaffney performed at Noise Pop Festival in San Francisco in 2002, 2003, and 2007, and at CMJ in 1990, 1998, 2006.

In 2007, Sebadoh reformed with the original line-up as "Classic Sebadoh," with a full U.S. Tour. Domino reissue of Sebadoh III, and The Freed Man. Bubble & Scrape was reissued on Domino/Sub Pop, Sebadoh toured Europe in 2008, including All Tomorrow's Parties, UK, Primavera Festival, Barcelona, and co-headlined Pitchfork Festival 2008 with Public Enemy and Mission of Burma.

Gaffney currently sells music via his Bandcamp page, and has twenty records digitally distributed worldwide. Land of Make Believe Limited Edition Vinyl LP released by Almost Halloween Time, Bari, Italy, 2016. Joyful Noise released a limited edition "Cassetterospective" box set of ten cassette records in 2015.

Discography

See Also Sebadoh discography

Albums
Toxic Friends (as member of Toxic Friends) 2019
Ghost of Christmas Future (animal friends/academia tapes)
Land of Make Believe (Almost Halloween Time, Italy) 2016
"Cassetterospective" (limited edition of 100 cassette box set) Joyful Noise, 2015
Gracefully Aging Hippy Soloists (1986–1987) Academia, 2014
Jesus Christ/Alasdair Roberts split-single (Happy Soul Records) 2013
America's Drug (Animal Friends) 2011
Down By The Bay 2011
The World Turned Upside Down 2010
Big Rock Candy Mountain  2010
Sailor On The Rainpool Seas (Animal Friends) 2009
Uncharted Waters (Old Gold/Handmade Records) 2006
Fields of Gaffney 'Cosmic Chicken and Egg.' 2005
Fields of Gaffney "Nature Walk" CD, 2003
Brilliant Concert Numbers CD, Old Gold Records, 1999
In The Noonday Sun (Animal Friends) 2002
Another Galaxy (Animal Friends) 1999
Yosemite Sam Lunchbox (Animal Friends) 1997
Portland Or Bust (Animal Friends) 1991
Moldy Bread (Animal Friends) 1989
Face Of Man (Animal Friends) 1989
Sore Foot Weirdy (Animal Friends) 1988

Singles and compilation albums 
"The Dunes" on 'Down in a Mirror" Jandek tribute Vol II (Summersteps Records, Moscow, PA.)
 "Wanna Be With You/Long Journey" split 7-inch with Pernath, Morc Records, 2004
 "Pinball Machine" track on Cool Beans #15 CD, 2003
"Too Bad Luck" on "What, Are You on Drugs? Comp. CD (Ant Lunch, Florida) 2002
 "Paws On Paws Off" track on "Lo-Fi" CD from São Paulo, Brazil, 2002
 "Cold Weather" b/w Twilight, Sub Pop Singles Club, January 2000
 "The Other Day" track on Cool Beans CD Sampler, 1999

Cassette releases
"Fields of Gaffney vol. 2" Limited Edition Cassette, 1999 (out of print)
"Lights Up and Spins Around" Limited Edition cassette, 1998 (out of print)
'Family Grub' cassette comp 1990 (out of print)
'Happy Valley Screwball Institute' cassette comp (90 min) 1990 (out of print)                                                                                              *Sebadoh 'The Freed Man' 1988 (30 min cassette)
Gracefully Aging Hippy Soloists 1986 'Plundering Latenight' cassette 90 min
Grey Matter, cassette 1983

Records with Sebadoh (1988–2008)
'Bubble & Scrape' 15th Anniversary Reissue. 2008 Domino (UK) Sub Pop (U.S.)
'The Freed Man' (tracks from the original cassette, vinyl LP, and CD, the first singles, previously unreleased tracks) 2007 (Domino)                                                                                            *'Wade Through The Boggs' (1990–1993 era unreleased Sebadoh tracks) ltd edition 1,000)
Sebadoh III (Domino Records) reissue w. 2nd CD of bonus tracks. 2006
"Tarred and Furthered," "Delicious Cakes" from 1990 EP (Silt Breeze Records) 1999
"Beauty of the Ride" EP (drums on "16" and "Slintstrumental," BBC sessions '92-93) 1996
"Bakesale" (drums on 4 songs from 1993 Chicago session with Bob Weston) (Sub Pop/Domino) 1994
"Bubble & Scrape" (Sub Pop/Domino) 1993. City Slang (Berlin) Sony (Japan) 1993
bonus single w. LP in UK, (Domino)
"Soul & Fire EP" (Domino/Sub Pop) 1993
Single (Sub Pop) "Bouquet For A Siren" (1st version) 1993
"Smash Your Head On The Punk Rock"(Sub Pop) 1992
"Rockin' The Forest Vs. Helmet" (City Slang, Germany)  Oct 1992
"Sebadoh Vs. Helmet" (Domino, U.K.)  October, 1992
"Rockin' The Forest" (20/20, Domino U.K.)  Summer, 1992
Split-single -"Loma Prieta" (Dark Beloved Cloud) 1991
"Oven Is My Friend" 45rpm EP (Silt Breeze) 1991
"Sebadoh III" (Homestead) 1991
"Gimme Indie Rock" 45rpm single (Homestead) 1991
"The Freed Weed" (Homestead)  1990
"Asshole" (Vertical) one side; "Julienne," "Elements," "Attention," "Your Long Journey." 1990
"Magic Ribbons" (Leopard Gecko) Box Set (split single, 45 rpm red vinyl) "Design," "Cyster," *"Lorax," 1989
"The Freed Man" (Homestead) Vinyl/Cassette, 1989
"Split single" with Big Stick (Sonic Life) U.K.1989
'The Freed Man' cassette (no label) 1988

References

External links
Eric Gaffney (Sebadoh co-founder)
Eric Gaffney - The Midwest Action Interview
Amplitude Equals One Over Frequency Squared: Eric Gaffney Interview
Ex-Sebadoh Co-Founder Eric Gaffney Is Now Jesus Christ, Kind Of
Fields of Gaffney
"Uncharted Waters" at Allmusic.com
Pop Matters interview, 2006
San Francisco Bay Guardian review, 2002
Interview, Tucson Weekly 2003
Eric Gaffney Albums

1967 births
Living people
American male singers
American rock singers
Songwriters from Massachusetts
American rock drummers
Sebadoh members
20th-century American drummers
American male drummers